This is a list of writers born or who have lived in Northern Ireland.



B
Tony Bailie (born 1962)
Jo Bannister (born 1951)
Colin Bateman (born 1962)
Ronan Bennett (born 1956)
Maureen Boyle (born 1961)
Kenneth Branagh (born 1960)
Colette Bryce (born 1970)
Eve Bunting (born 1928)
James Burke (born 1936)
Anna Burns (born 1962)

C
Lucy Caldwell (born 1982)
Joseph Campbell (1879–1944)
William Carleton (novelist)  (1794–1869) 
Thomas Carnduff (1886–1956)
Ciarán Carson (1948–2019)
Joyce Cary (1888–1957)
James Cousins (1873–1956)
Kathleen Coyle (1886–1952)
Mairtín Crawford (1967–2004)
Sam Cree (1928–1980)
Eric Cross (1905–1980)

D
Gerald Dawe (born 1952)
Seamus Deane (1940–2021)
Anne Devlin (born 1951)
Susannah Dickey
Richard Doherty
Moyra Donaldson (born 1956)
Charles Donnelly (1914–1937)
John Dougherty (born 1964)
Garbhan Downey

E
St. John Greer Ervine (1883–1971)

F
Padraic Fiacc (1924–2019)
Leontia Flynn (born 1974)
Brendan Foley (born 1964)
Brian Friel (1929–2015)
Seamus Finnegan (born 1949)

G
Stephen Gilbert (1912–2010)
Robert Greacen (1920–2008)

H
Sam Hanna Bell (1909–1990)
Francis Harvey (1925–2014)
Seamus Heaney (1939–2013)
John Hewitt (1907–1987)
Sir John Heygate, 4th Baronet (1903-1976)
Gareth Higgins (born 1975)
Bulmer Hobson (1882–1969)

J
Carolyn Jess-Cooke (born 1978)
Fred Johnston (born 1951)

K
Brian Keenan (born 1950)
Brian Kennedy (born 1966)
Benedict Kiely (1919–2007)

L
Nick Laird (born 1975)
Maurice Leitch (born 1933)
Clive Staples Lewis (1898–1963)
Antonia Logue (born 1972)
Michael Longley (born 1939)
Robert Wilson Lynd (1879–1949)

M

Bernard MacLaverty (born 1942)
Louis MacNeice (1907–1963)
Deirdre Madden (born 1960)
Derek Mahon (1941–2020)
Philip MacCann (born 1967)
Owen McCafferty (born 1961)
Eamonn McCann (born 1943)
Hugh McFadden
Roy McFadden (1921–1999)
Medbh McGuckian (born 1950)
Christina McKenna
Adrian McKinty
David McKittrick (born 1949)
Robert McLiam Wilson (born 1966)
Nigel McLoughlin (born 1968)
George McWhirter (born 1939)
Eoin McNamee (born 1961)
Sam Millar (born 1955)
Alice Milligan (1865–1953)
Gary Mitchell (born 1965)
Frances Molloy (1947–1991), novelist
Brian Moore (1921–1999)
Sinéad Morrissey (born 1972)
Danny Morrison (born 1953)
Paul Muldoon (born 1951)
Paul Murray (born 1947)
Tony Macaulay (writer) (born 1963)

N
Stuart Neville

O
Flann O'Brien (1911–1966)
Conor O'Callaghan (born 1968)
Malachi O'Doherty (born 1951)
Moira O'Neill (1864–1955)
Séamus Ó Néill (1910–1986)
Frank Ormsby (born 1947)
James Orr (1770-1816)

David Park
Stewart Parker (1941–1988)
Glenn Patterson (born 1961)
Tom Paulin (born 1945)
William Peskett (born 1952)

Q

R
Zane Radcliffe
Christina Reid
Forrest Reid (1875–1947)
Graham Reid (born 1945)
Amanda McKittrick Ross (1860–1939)
Richard Rowley (1877–1947)
George William Russell (1867–1935)

S
Ian Sansom (born 1966)
Bob Shaw (1931–1996)
George Shiels (1886–1949)
James Simmons (1933–2001)
Geoffrey Squires (born 1942)

T
Gerald J. Tate (born 1954)
Sam Thompson (1916–1965)
Joseph Tomelty (1911–1995)

W
James White (1928–1999)
Robert McLiam Wilson (born 1964)

Y
Ella Young (1865–1951)

References
Irish Playography
The Encyclopaedia of Ireland, Gill and Macmillan, Dublin, 2003
Irish Writers Online
Culture Northern Ireland
Arts Council of Northern Ireland

 
Writers
Northern Irish
 
Writers,Northern